2018 Shenzhen Open – Singles may refer to:

2018 ATP Shenzhen Open – Singles
2018 WTA Shenzhen Open – Singles

See also 

2018 Shenzhen Open (disambiguation)